Karlamunda is a town in Bhawanipatna sub-division  in Kalahandi district in Orissa State.This town is maintaining 70 km distance from its District main city Bhawanipatna and 430 km far from its State capital Bhubaneswar.

References

Recently (Bhagabata Parayana)
Gaja Laxmi Puja

Cities and towns in Kalahandi district